This is a list of yearly records for NCAA Division I FCS independents .

Division I FCS standings

References

Independents
Standings